The Pacific redfin (Tribolodon brandtii)  is a species of fish in the family Cyprinidae.
It is found from the Siberian Pacific Coast through coastal Japan.

References

Tribolodon
Fish described in 1872